California Proposition 55 may refer to:

 California Proposition 55 (2004)
 California Proposition 55 (2016)